Allmond is a surname.  Notable people with the surname include:

 Corey Allmond (born 1988), American basketball player
 Len Allmond (1925–2011), Australian rugby league footballer
 Marcell Allmond (born 1981), American football player
 Ruby Allmond (1923–2006), American singer-songwriter

See also
 Almond